Sweet Thing(s) may refer to:

Music
 Sweet Thing (band), a Canadian pop rock group
 Clydie King & The Sweet Things

Albums
 Sweet Thing (album), a 1997 album by Boney James
 Sweet Things (Georgie Fame album), a 1966 album by Georgie Fame
 Sweet Things (ThaMuseMeant album), an album by ThaMuseMeant

Songs
 "Sweet Thang", a song by Nat Stuckey, also covered by Ernest Tubb, Loretta Lynn, Gene Summers
 "Sweet Thing" (Rufus song), also covered by Mary J. Blige
 "Sweet Thing" (David Bowie song), suite of songs written by David Bowie
 "Sweet Thing" (Keith Urban song), a 2008 song
 "Sweet Thing" (Van Morrison song), song on 1968 album Astral Weeks
 "Sweet Thing" (Mick Jagger song), a 1992 song
 "Sweet Thing", by Yazoo from You and Me Both
 "Sweet Things", song by Indiana Gregg
 "Sweet Things", song by Tiësto from Elements of Life

See also 
 Sweetest Thing (disambiguation)
 Sweet Sticky Thing, the name of a popular song by funk band Ohio Players
 Sweet Young Thing, a song by the Monkees